WMC may refer to:
 Wah Medical College, a private medical college in the Punjab, Pakistan
 Wales Millennium Centre, a performing arts centre in Cardiff, Wales
 War Manpower Commission, a World War II agency of the United States Government
 Warlocks Motorcycle Club (disambiguation), various "outlaw" motorcycle clubs in the US
 Web Map Context, an Open Geospatial Consortium standard in GIS
 Wenzhou Medical College, now Wenzhou Medical University, in Wenzhou, China
 Western Michigan Christian High School, a private school in Muskegon, Michigan
 Western Mining Corporation, later WMC Resources; now owned by BHP Billiton
 White Monopoly Capital, a political catchphrase in South Africa
 Windows Media Center, a discontinued digital video recorder and media player for Microsoft Windows
 Windows Media Connect, server software for Microsoft Windows computers to share and stream media to WMC clients
 Winter Music Conference, an annual electronic music conference
 Wirral Metropolitan College, a system of colleges in the area of Birkenhead, UK
 Wisconsin Manufacturers & Commerce, an association of manufacturers, service businesses, and chambers of commerce in Wisconsin
 WMC (AM), a radio station (790 AM) licensed to Memphis, Tennessee, United States
 WMC Mortgage (1955-2007), a defunct California mortgage lender
 WMC-FM, a radio station (99.7 FM) licensed to Memphis, Tennessee, United States
 WMC-TV, a television station (channel 5 digital) licensed to Memphis, Tennessee, United States
 Women Media Center, an NGO in Pakistan
 Women's Murder Club (TV series) (2007-2008), an American TV series
 Working men's club, a type of social club common in England
 Working Men's College, an adult education provider in London
 World Macedonian Congress, an NGO for ethnic Macedonians
 World Malayalee Council, an NGO for Malalayee and Keralite people living abroad
 World Methodist Council, international association of Methodist churches
 World Mobile Congress, misstatement of Mobile World Congress
 World Muaythai Council, international association for Muaythai martial arts
 World Music Competition, international musical contest in Kerkrade, Netherlands